Anthony Robbins was the Director of the U.S. National Institute for Occupational Safety and Health from 1978 to 1981.  He later became a professor at the Tufts University School of Medicine.

References

External links 

National Institute for Occupational Safety and Health